The 1990 Montreal municipal election took place on November 4, 1990, to elect a mayor and city councillors in Montreal, Quebec, Canada. Jean Doré was elected to a second term as mayor by a significant margin.

All mayoral candidates were also permitted to run for seats on council in tandem with "co-listed candidates." In this way, all unsuccessful mayoral candidates could serve on council by assuming the seat of their co-lister (provided, of course, that the co-lister was elected).

Elections were also held in Montreal's suburban communities.

Results (incomplete)
The party colours do not indicate affiliation with or resemblance to any other municipal, provincial, or federal party.

Elections in suburban communities (incomplete)

Dorval

Sources: "West Island vote brings new faces into municipal politics," Montreal Gazette, November 6, 1990, A5; "Two newcomers victorious in Pointe Claire election," Montreal Gazette, November 8, 1990, G2.

Montréal-Nord

Sources: Mike King, "Battling 272 years of experience; Mayor and his team have been in power since 1963," Montreal Gazette, 21 October 1994, A4; Mike King, "Ryan wins again; Ninth straight victory for patriarch of local mayors," Montreal Gazette, November 7, 1994, A5. The former source indicates that Lessard, Morin, Belanger, Gibeau, and Nadeau were incumbents in 1994. The latter source indicates the scale of Ryan's victory in 1990, although it does not indicate the council winners. 

All of the Renouveau municipal councillors listed above were members of the Montréal-Nord city council during the 1986–90 term, and all except Armand Nadeau (who did not seek re-election in 1994) served during the 1994–98 term. Given the overwhelming dominance of the Renouveau municipal party in Montréal-Nord and the generally low rates of council turnover in this period, it may be safely assumed that all were re-elected in 1990.

Saint-Leonard (incomplete)

Results in other Montreal-area communities

Longueuil
The governing Parti municipal de Longueuil was returned to office. Party leader Roger Ferland was re-elected to a second term as mayor, and the party won seventeen out of twenty seats on council. The remaining three seats were won by the opposition Parti civique de Longueuil.

Winning candidates are listed in boldface.

Sources: Mike King, "Two mayors unseated on South Shore," Montreal Gazette, November 5, 1990, A5; Mike King, "Ferland outlasts foe in Longueuil race; Municipal Party keeps control with 17 of 20 seats on council," Montreal Gazette, November 8, 1990, G1; Le Parti municipal de Longueuil: Roger Ferland, le gestionnaire, Société historique et culturelle du Marigot, accessed February 19, 2014.

References

1990 Quebec municipal elections
Municipal elections in Montreal
1990 in Quebec
1990s in Montreal